Królewiec may refer to:
The Polish name for Kaliningrad, Kaliningrad Oblast, Russia (formerly Königsberg)
The Polish name for Krolevets, Sumy Oblast, Ukraine
Królewiec, Lower Silesian Voivodeship, Poland
Królewiec, Świętokrzyskie Voivodeship, Poland
Królewiec, Masovian Voivodeship, Poland
Królewiec, Greater Poland Voivodeship, Poland